Urtica membranacea is a species of annual herb in the family Urticaceae native to the Mediterranean Basin. They have a self-supporting growth form and simple, broad leaves. Individuals can grow to 39 cm tall.

Sources

References 

membranacea
Flora of Malta